Jason's Gem is a computer game for the ZX Spectrum. It was published in 1985 by Mastertronic and written by Simon White. The hero Jason must make his way through a series of caves in search of the legendary gem of the title.

The game begins with Jason docking his spaceship on a moving platform.  He then descends through rocky caverns blasting away the rocks as he goes.  Upon reaching the bottom of the caves he must negotiate a series of platform screens before reaching his goal and attaining glory.

External links 

GameFAQs

1985 video games
Europe-exclusive video games
Mastertronic games
ZX Spectrum games
ZX Spectrum-only games
Video games developed in the United Kingdom